This Time is a studio album by Los Lobos, released in 1999 on Hollywood Records.

Critical reception
Entertainment Weekly wrote that "the important thing is that Los Lobos do fusion like nobody else, twisting a tangle of influences into tightly wound explorations of sound and rhythm that are genuinely electric, not just eclectic."

Track listing

Personnel 
On the liner notes, the specific contributions of the members of Los Lobos are not mentioned, but are assumed to be the "usual," as noted below.  Other personnel are credited as described below.

Los Lobos
 David Hidalgo – vocals, guitar, accordion, fiddle, requinto jarocho
 Louie Pérez – vocals, guitar, jarana
 Cesar Rosas – vocals, guitar, bajo sexto
 Conrad Lozano – vocals, bass, guitarron
 Steve Berlin – keyboards, horns
Additional musicians
 Pete Thomas – drums on all tracks except "Corazõn," "Cumbia Raza," and "This Time"
 Alex Acuña – drums and percussion on "Corazõn" and "Cumbia Raza"
 Aaron Ballesteros – drums on "This Time"
 Victor Bisetti – percussion
 Mitchell Froom – additional keyboards
Production
 Mitchell Froom – producer 
 Tchad Blake – producer, engineer, mixing  
 Los Lobos – producer 
 John Paterno – engineer  
 Husky S. Hoskulds – engineer 
 Howard Willing – assistant engineer   
 Josh Turner – assistant engineer
 Joe Zook – assistant engineer 
 Bob Ludwig – mastering
 John Heiden – art direction 
 Jeri Heiden – art direction  
 Louie Pérez – art direction, Polaroid photography, art 
 Clay Patrick McBride – band photography, collages

Charts

References

1999 albums
Los Lobos albums
Hollywood Records albums